Hayato Tsutsumi (born 12 July 1999) is a Japanese professional boxer. As an amateur, Tsutsumi won a gold medal at the 2016 World Youth Championships. Tsutsumi also competed at the 2021 World Championships.

Amateur career

Asian Games result
Jakarta-Palembang 2018
Round of 32: Defeated by Kharkhuu Enkhamar (Mongolia) 3–2

World Championship result
Belgrade 2021
First round: Defeated Lázaro Álvarez (Cuba) 5–0
Second round: Defeated Theocharis Karzis (Greece) 5–0
Third round: Defeated by Vsevolod Skumkov (ROC) 4–1

Professional career

Early career
On 13 July 2022, Tsutsumi made his professional debut against Jhon Gemino. Tsutsumi was declared the winner via wide unanimous decision after outboxing his opponent throughout the duration of the bout. Tsutsumi faced Pete Apolinar on 31 December 2022. In the sixth round, Tsutsumi dropped his opponent after landing a combination of punches. Despite Apolinar recovering from the knockdown, Tsutsumi secured a wide unanimous decision win after controlling the duration of the bout.

Professional boxing record

References

External links

1999 births
Living people
People from Chiba (city)
People from Chiba Prefecture
Japanese male boxers
Featherweight boxers